The Our Lady, Star of the Sea & St Maughold Church is the name given to a religious building that is affiliated with the Catholic Church and is located in Dale Street, in Ramsey the second largest city in the Isle of Man, a dependency of the British Crown.

The church follows the Roman or Latin rite and is under the administration of the Catholic Diocese of Liverpool (Archidioecesis Liverpolitanus) based in the United Kingdom. St Maughold name refers to a Catholic saint who died in 498, whose name in Irish also be written as MacCuill, Maguil, or Maccul.

Its history dates back to 1893 when a small chapel was opened. Over time more funds and a new church began to be built based on the design of Giles Gilbert Scott in 1909, to be completed the following year was raised. The church's reredos was created by Frances Bessie Burlison.

It is one of the Registered Buildings of the Isle of Man.

See also
Roman Catholicism in the Isle of Man
Church of Our Lady (disambiguation)

References

Roman Catholic churches in the Isle of Man
Our Lady
Roman Catholic churches completed in 1893
Registered Buildings of the Isle of Man
19th-century Roman Catholic church buildings in the United Kingdom